A porpoise is a marine mammal of the family Phocoenidae.

Porpoise may also refer to:

 Dolphin or dolphin-like marine mammal, previously used in American english
 Porpoise (scuba gear), a trade name for scuba gear developed by Ted Eldred in Australia
 Porpoise class submarine (disambiguation), various classes of British or United States submarines
 HMS Porpoise, several British Royal Navy ships
 USS Porpoise, several United States Navy ships

See also
 Porpoising, a fault encountered in ground effect racing cars